Župarić is a Croatian surname. Notable people with the surname include:

 Dario Župarić (born 1992), Croatian footballer
 Đurica Župarić (born 1984), Croatian footballer 

Croatian surnames